

Current

 5th Avenue Cinema
 Academy Theater
 Aladdin Theater
 Alberta Rose Theatre
 Alhambra Theatre
 Antoinette Hatfield Hall
 Arlene Schnitzer Concert Hall
 Artists Repertory Theatre
 Avalon Theatre
 Bagdad Theatre
 Cinema 21
 Cinemagic Theater
 Clinton Street Theater
 First Regiment Armory Annex
 Hawthorne Theatre
 Hollywood Theatre
 Kennedy School
 Laurelhurst Theater
 Mission Theater and Pub
 Moreland Theater
 National Cash Register Building
 Oregon Theatre
 Paris Theatre
 Portland's Centers for the Arts
 Roseland Theater
 Roseway Theater
 St. Johns Twin Cinema
 Star Theater

Former

 Broadway Theatre
 Fox Theatre
 Guild Theatre
 Oriental Theatre
 Playhouse Theatre
 United Artists Theatre

See also
 Imago Theatre (Portland, Oregon)

Portland, Oregon
Theatres
Theatres in Portland, Oregon
Theaters in Portland